The 1924 Ball Teachers Hoosieroons football team was an American football team that represented Muncie State Normal School (later renamed Ball State University) during the 1924 college football season. In the first season in school history, the team compiled a 1–3 record and was outscored by a total of 11 to 87. The team played its home games at Normal Field in Muncie, Indiana. Their coach was Billy Williams.

Schedule

References

Muncie Normal
Ball State Cardinals football seasons
Muncie Normal Hoosieroons football